Gymnelia herodes is a moth of the subfamily Arctiinae. It was described by Druce, 1883. It is found in Ecuador.

References

Gymnelia
Moths described in 1883